Human sexual response may refer to:

 Human sexual arousal
 Human Sexual Response, a 1966 book by Masters and Johnson
 Human sexual response cycle, a four-stage model of physiological responses during sexual stimulation first described by Masters and Johnson
Human sexual function
 Human Sexual Response (band), a new wave musical group from Boston, Massachusetts, United States

See also
Sexual Response (1992 film)